Orlando von Einsiedel (born in August 1980) is a British film director. He directs mostly documentary films that investigate global social issues, and has filmed in various places around the world, including Africa, Asia, America and the Arctic. von Einsiedel became known for his award winning film Virunga, produced with the cooperation of Virunga National Park director Prince de Merode.

Early life 
Von Einsiedel is the grandson of Wittgo von Einsiedel (a second cousin to Heinrich Graf von Einsiedel, who descends from Otto von Bismarck) and Walburga von Obersdorff. His father, Andreas Jean-Paul von Einsiedel, was a photographer specialising in architecture and interiors. Orlando grew up in Forest Hill, London, UK with his mother (Harriet), a British music therapist. He attended Alleyn's, an independent school in East Dulwich, London, UK.

University 
Von Einsiedel studied social anthropology at the University of Manchester and an MSc in anthropology and development at the London School of Economics.

Film career 
Many of von Einsiedel's documentaries have been screened at some of the world's top film festivals. He directed Virunga (2014), which received an Academy Award nomination for Best Documentary Feature, and The White Helmets (2016), which won for Best Documentary (Short Subject). Both nominations were shared with producer Joanna Natasegara. His 2018 film, Evelyn, about his late brother, launched at the London Film Festival and won the BIFA for Best Documentary. In 2020, 'Learning to Skateboard in a Warzone (if you're a girl)', a film he was an executive producer on, won the Academy Award for Best Documentary (Short Subject).
In 2006, he co-founded Grain Media, a production company based in London.

Snowboard career 

Von Einsiedel spent several years as a professional snowboarder, travelling the world promoting the brand names of various sponsors through media engagements, photo/video shoots, and competitions. During this period he was given the nickname 'Jill Dando', due to the rhyme connection between his name and hers.

Selected filmography 
 Skateistan: To Live and Skate Kabul (2010)
 We Ride: The Story of Snowboarding (2013)
 Virunga (2014)
 The White Helmets (2016)
 Evelyn (2018)
 Convergence (2021)
 From Devil's Breath (2022)

References

External links 
 

1980 births
Living people
Counts of Germany
Directors of Best Documentary Short Subject Academy Award winners
English film directors
English screenwriters
English male screenwriters
Writers from London